The 1988 Paris Open was a Grand Prix men's tennis tournament played on indoor carpet courts. It was the 16th edition of the Paris Open (later known as the Paris Masters). It took place at the Palais omnisports de Paris-Bercy in Paris, France from 24 October through 31 October 1988. Unseeded Amos Mansdorf won the singles title.

Finals

Singles

 Amos Mansdorf defeated  Brad Gilbert 6–3, 6–2, 6–3
 It was Mansdorf's 2nd title of the year and the 4th of his career.

Doubles

 Paul Annacone /  John Fitzgerald defeated  Jim Grabb /  Christo van Rensburg 6–2, 6–2
 It was Annacone's only title of the year and the 11th of his career. It was Fitzgerald's 5th title of the year and the 22nd of his career.

References

External links 
 ATP tournament profile
 ITF tournament details